Țara Făgărașului (also Țara Oltului; , ,  or terra Alutus) is a region is southern Transylvania, Romania. Its main city is Făgăraș. On the north, it is bordered by the Olt River, while the region of Wallachia is to the south. In the Kingdom of Hungary and in Greater Romania, it corresponded to the counties of Fogaras and, respectively, Făgăraș. Today, it is divided between Brașov and Sibiu counties.

References

Historical regions of Transylvania